The Blue Line or Seagull Line is one of the four lines of Lisbon Metro. It is the only line of the Lisbon Metro entirely underground, without any viaduct.

Stations

Frequency

Chronology

29 December 1959: Opening of the original Lisbon Metro network with a Y shape. Common branch stations: Restauradores, Avenida, Rotunda (former name of the Marquês de Pombal station and where the line would split into the two branches). Current Blue Line branch stations (coming from Rotunda station): Parque, São Sebastião, Palhavã (former name of the Praça de Espanha station) and Sete Rios (former name of the Jardim Zoológico station). Current Yellow Line branch stations (coming from Rotunda station): Picoas, Saldanha, Campo Pequeno and Entre Campos.
27 January 1963: Opening of the Rossio station. Main branch route: Restauradores - Rossio.
28 September 1966: Opening of the Socorro (former name of the Martim Moniz station), Intendente and Anjos stations. Main branch route: Restauradores - Anjos.
18 June 1972: Opening of the Arroios, Alameda, Areeiro, Roma and Alvalade stations. Main branch route: Restauradores - Alvalade.
15 October 1988: Opening of the Cidade Universitária, Laranjeiras, Alto dos Moinhos and Colégio Militar/Luz stations. Current Blue Line branch route: Rotunda - Colégio Militar/Luz. Current Yellow Line branch route: Rotunda - Cidade Universitária.
3 April 1993: Opening of the Campo Grande station. Main branch route: Restauradores - Campo Grande. Current Yellow Line branch route: Rotunda - Campo Grande.
15 July 1995: Creation of the Blue and Yellow lines by building a second Rotunda station. New Blue line route: Colégio Militar/Luz - Campo Grande.
18 October 1997: Opening of the Carnide and Pontinha stations. Line route: Pontinha - Campo Grande.
1 March 1998: Palhavã station is renamed to Marquês de Pombal, Sete Rios station is renamed to Jardim Zoológico and Socorro station is renamed to Martim Moniz.
3 March 1998: Creation of the Blue and Green line by closing the Restauradores - Rossio tunnel. New Blue line route: Pontinha - Restauradores.
8 August 1998: Opening of the Baixa-Chiado station. Line route: Pontinha -  Baixa-Chiado.
15 May 2004: Opening of the Alfornelos and Amadora Este stations. Line route: Amadora Este -  Baixa-Chiado.
19 December 2007: Opening of the Terreiro do Paço and Santa Apolónia stations. Line route: Amadora Este - Santa Apolónia.
13 April 2016: Opening of the Reboleira station. Line route: Reboleira - Santa Apolónia.

See also
 List of Lisbon metro stations

References

External links

Lisbon Metro lines
Railway stations opened in 1959